The St. Louis County Law Library in Missouri was established in 1941 as a public law library under Missouri Statute.  It is located on the sixth floor of the Courts building in the St. Louis County Courthouse at 105 South Central in Clayton, Missouri.

It operates as a public agency, independent of St. Louis County government.  It is funded from a portion of the surcharge paid by parties to civil lawsuits in the 21st Judicial Circuit of the Missouri Circuit Courts.

Collection
The St. Louis County Law Library print collection is made up of many volumes including portions of the West National Reporter System, along with loose-leaf material, and a substantial portion of major treatises on a wide range of legal and ancillary disciplines. 
In addition, the St. Louis County Law Library also grants free access to  Westlaw.

References
St. Louis County Bar Association: About Page
Twenty First Judicial Circuit Court Rule 100.3
St. Louis County Law Library Website

External links

Public libraries in Missouri
Missouri state courts
Law libraries in the United States
Buildings and structures in St. Louis County, Missouri
Education in St. Louis County, Missouri